Back of My Mind may refer to:

 Back of My Mind (Christopher Cross album)
 Back of My Mind (H.E.R. album)